John Stowell is an American musician.

John Stowell may also refer to:

John M. Stowell, Wisconsin politician
John Stowell (MP) for Malmesbury (UK Parliament constituency)